Amy Monticello (born 1982) is an American essayist, lecturer, and non fiction writer. Monticello is the author of Close Quarters (Sweet Publications, 2012) and How to Euthanize a Horse (Arcadia Press, 2018).

Life and work
Amy Monticello was born in Endicott, New York in 1982. She earned a Master of Fine Arts in creative writing at The Ohio State University in 2008. Her book Close Quarters, is classified as a chapbook. In constructing her non-fiction chapbook she took a collection of her shorter essays from a larger project she was working on and used the novella form as a guide.  She is an Associate Professor at Suffolk University in Boston, MA.

Works

Books 
 Close Quarters. Sweet Publications, 2012.
 "How to Euthanize a Horse." Arcadia Press, 2018.

Anthology Inclusions 
 Tuscaloosa Writes This, “Communing with Cancer,” Eds. Brian Oliu and Patti White, Slash Pine Press, 2013.
 Going Om, “Against the Pursuit of Happiness,” Ed. Melissa Carroll, Viva editions/Cleis Press, forthcoming 2014.

Journal Publications 
 "How to Tell the Story of an Ordinary Death." ''Los Angeles Review of Books. 
 "Not Nothing." Brevity. 
 "My Only Child Scatters My Ashes." CALYX'. 
 "Resuscitate." Hotel Amerika. 
 "Letters From My Father." Brain, Child. 
 "A New and Magical Life." The Rumpus. 
 “Waiting for My Milk During the Polar Vortex, I Channel William Blake.” The Common “Moderation is the Key.” Prime Number. 
 “Shame.” Brevity. 
 “The Short Summer.” The Common. 
 “The Faces We Carry.”The Nervous Breakdown. 
 “Eighteen One-Sided Conversations With My Father.” Women Arts Quarterly Journal.  “Playing the Odds.” The Nervous Breakdown. 
 “Communing with Cancer.” Salon.com. 
 “Loving Captain Corcoran.” Stone Canoe. 
 “I Know Who You Are.”The Nervous Breakdown. 
 Untitled 140-character micro-essay. Creative Nonfiction. 
 “How to Euthanize a Horse.” Natural Bridge. 
 “The Other Woman.” Iron Horse Literary Review. Notable Essay in Best American Essays. 
 “Christmas 1984.” The Nervous Breakdown.  “Suburban.” Connotation Press: An Online Artifact. 
 “A Good Man.” WomenArts Quarterly Journal. 
 “Chimney Swift.” Sweet: A Literary Confection. 
 “The North Side.” Phoebe.  “All the Ways We Fool Ourselves.” Waccamaw. 
 “Getting Caught.” Prick of the Spindle. 
 “Winter.” Upstreet. 
 “Miracles We Get.” Redivider. 
 “Tradition.”The Rambler. 
 “Looking Forward.” Word Riot. 
 “Errands.” Flashquake.

 Craft Articles 
 “In Defense of the Confessional: Parenting, Inclusivity, and J.D. Schraffenberger’s ‘Droppies Babies’.” Essay Daily. 2014.
 “Hello New Year, Hello 30: A Craft Conversation with Marissa Landrigan.” Her Kind: A Literary Community Powered by VIDA. 2013.
 “More Than One True Thing.” Waccamaw. Issue 11.
 “The Place Where Opposing Instincts Meet.” Tuscaloosa Writes This. Eds. Brian Oliu and Patti White, Slash Pine Press, 2013.

 Honors 
 Winner, Arcadia Press Chapbook Prize, 2016. 
 Winner, S.I. Newhouse School Prize in Nonfiction, 2013.
 Nominee, Pushcart Prize, 2011.
 Recipient, certificate of appreciation for collaborative course development. Ithaca College Division of Student Affairs, 2011.
 Nominee, Pushcart Prize, 2010.
 Finalist, The Journal''’s Alumni Flash Writing Contest, The Ohio State University, 2010.
 Nominee, The Ohio State University's Graduate Associate Teaching Award, 2007.
 Recipient of commendation letter for excellence in teaching from The Ohio State University's First-Year Writing Program, 2006.
 Winner, Ithaca College Writing Contest in creative nonfiction and poetry, 2005.

References

1982 births
Living people
21st-century American memoirists
People from Endicott, New York
Writers from New York (state)
Writers from Wisconsin
American women essayists
American women memoirists
Ohio State University alumni
21st-century American women writers
University of Wisconsin–Eau Claire faculty
21st-century American essayists
American women academics